Peter Wood (born 11 November 1939) is  a former Australian rules footballer who played with Footscray in the Victorian Football League (VFL).

Notes

External links 

1939 births
Living people
Australian rules footballers from Victoria (Australia)
Western Bulldogs players
Oakleigh Football Club players